Nahid Hasan is an Indian politician and a member of the 18th Uttar Pradesh Legislative Assembly. He was also a member of the 16th and 17th Legislative Assembly of Uttar Pradesh. Hasan represents the Kairana constituency of Uttar Pradesh and is a member of the Samajwadi Party.

Early life and education
Nahid Hasan was born in a Muslim Gurjar family of Kairana in the district of Shamli, Uttar Pradesh.

Hasan holds Bachelor of Business Administration degree from Holmes Institute in Sydney. His father Chaudhary Munawwar Hasan was an MLA in the 11th and the 12th legislative assemblies of Uttar Pradesh as well as a Member of 11th and 14th Lok Sabha and became Rajya sabha member from 1998 till 2003. Munawwar Hasan was also elected as a Member of Legislative Council (MLC) from Muzaffarnagar-Saharanpur Local Body Authorities constituency in 2003. Nahid's mother, Begum Tabassum Hasan has also been elected to the Lok Sabha in 2009 and 2018.

Political career
Nahid Hasan has been a MLA for three-terms. Hasan represents Kairana constituency and is a member of the Samajwadi Party. In Oct. 2014, he was elected to office after sitting member Hukum Singh got elected to the 16th Lok Sabha. In the by-poll election, he defeated Bhartiya Janata Party candidate Anil Kumar by a margin of 1,099 votes.

He was elected to the Seventeenth Legislative Assembly of Uttar Pradesh in 2017, he defeated Bhartiya Janata Party candidate Mriganka Singh by a margin of 21,162 votes.

In 2022 Uttar Pradesh Legislative Assembly election, Hasan again defeated Mriganka Singh by 25,887 votes.

Legal cases 
Nahid Hasan broke the traffic rule and misbehaved with the police. After the incident, he ran away and wasn't found at his residence in Police raid. Later, he was declared as 'absconder' and was booked under sections 153, 353 and 453 of the IPC. A total of 12 FIRs have been lodged on Hasan which include serious crimes like attempt to murder, forgery and attempt to incite communal tensions.

Posts held

Elections contested

See also

Kairana
Uttar Pradesh Legislative Assembly
Government of India
Politics of India
Samajwadi Party

References 

1988 births
Living people
Samajwadi Party politicians
People from Shamli district
Uttar Pradesh MLAs 2017–2022
Uttar Pradesh MLAs 2022–2027